List of fish of the North Sea consists of 201 species, both indigenous, and also introduced, listed in systematic index. It includes 40 species of Chondrichthyes, three species of Agnatha, the other are bony fishes.

The following tags are used to indicate the conservation status of species by IUCN's criteria:

All the listed species are classified by their origin as native, introduced, invasive, and species found accidentally (difficult to characterize as native or invasive).

List

See also
 List of fish in Germany
 List of fish of the Black Sea

References

Sources 
 Sven Gehrmann: Die Fauna der Nordsee — Wirbeltiere: Meerestiere der nordeuropäischen Küsten. April 2009, 
 Bent J. Muus, Jørgen G. Nielsen: Die Meeresfische Europas. In Nordsee, Ostsee und Atlantik. Franckh-Kosmos Verlag, 
 FishBase Fishspecies in North Sea

'
'
North Sea
North